Dondré Terrell Whitfield (born May 27, 1969) is an American actor. He began his career appearing in a recurring role as Robert Foreman on the NBC sitcom The Cosby Show (1985–87), before playing Terrence Frye in the ABC Daytime soap opera, All My Children (1991–94). He received three Daytime Emmy Award for Outstanding Younger Actor in a Drama Series nominations for his performance on All My Children.

Whitfield had starring role in a number of short-lived sitcoms, include The Crew (1995–96), Between Brothers (1997–99), and Hidden Hills (2002–03). He also has appeared in a number of films, such as Two Can Play That Game (2001), The Salon (2004), Pastor Brown (2009), and Middle of Nowhere (2012). In 2015, Whitfield joined the cast of BET reality comedy series Real Husbands of Hollywood, and in 2016 began starring in the Oprah Winfrey Network drama series, Queen Sugar.

Career

Whitfield began his television career appearing in the recurring role on the NBC sitcom The Cosby Show as Robert Foreman (the love interest of Tempestt Bledsoe's character Vanessa Huxtable). He later had a two year-run on the NBC daytime soap opera, Another World. From 1991 to 1994, Whitfield portrayed Terrence Frye in the ABC Daytime soap opera, All My Children. The role earned him nominations for three Daytime Emmy Award for Outstanding Younger Actor in a Drama Series and two Soap Opera Digest Awards.
 
After leaving daytime television, Whitfield starred in the short-lived Fox sitcom The Crew during 1995–96 season. In 1997, he went to star alongside Kadeem Hardison in another short-lived sitcom, Between Brothers. He had dramatic turn in the 2000 UPN series Secret Agent Man, it also was cancelled after one season. From 2002 to 2003, he starred alongside Tamara Taylor in another short-lived sitcom, Hidden Hills on NBC. From 2001 to 2002, Whitfield had a recurring role on the UPN sitcom Girlfriends. He also has appeared on The Jamie Foxx Show, NYPD Blue, Strong Medicine, Ghost Whisperer, CSI: Miami, Cold Case, and Grey's Anatomy.

In film, Whitfield has appeared opposite Vivica A. Fox in Two Can Play That Game (2001), and The Salon (2004). He co-starred in White Man's Burden (1995), Mr. 3000 (2003), and Middle of Nowhere (2012). He has appeared along with his wife Salli Richardson in 2009 film Pastor Brown, and well as guest-starred on Eureka (in which he played Richardson's on-screen brother), and Stitchers. Whitfield also had the recurring roles on Make It or Break It and Mistresses as Rochelle Aytes' husband. In 2015, Whitfield joined the cast of BET reality comedy series Real Husbands of Hollywood.

In 2016, Whitfield was cast in the Oprah Winfrey Network drama series, Queen Sugar produced by Ava DuVernay and Oprah Winfrey.

Personal life
Whitfield was born in Brooklyn, New York. He attended the Performing Arts High School in New York City.

In 2002, Whitfield married actress Salli Richardson. They have two children: a daughter and a son.

Filmography

Film

Television

Awards and nominations

References

External links

1969 births
Living people
African-American male actors
American male film actors
American male soap opera actors
American male television actors
Male actors from New York City
People from Brooklyn
20th-century American male actors
21st-century American male actors
20th-century African-American people
21st-century African-American people